Table Mountain fire may refer to:

 2000 Table Mountain fire
 2006 Table Mountain fire
 2009 Table Mountain fire
 2015 Table Mountain fire
 2021 Table Mountain fire